Robert Raglan (7 April 1909 – 18 July 1985) was a British actor best known for his semi-regular role in Dad's Army as Colonel Pritchard. He also starred in a number of other television series and films such as Fabian of the Yard (1954–56) and The Haunted House of Horror (1969). He also appeared in Danger Man with Patrick McGoohan, and Scotland Yard.

Partial filmography

 The Courtneys of Curzon Street (1947) - (uncredited)
 Circus Boy (1947) - Trevor
 Night Beat (1947) - Det. Sgt (uncredited)
 The Ringer (1952) - (uncredited)
 The Broken Horseshoe (1953) - (uncredited)
 Recoil (1953) - Sgt Perkins
 The Good Beginning (1953) - Shelley (uncredited)
 Gilbert Harding Speaking of Murder (1953) - Inspector McKay (uncredited)
 Child's Play (1954) - Police Superintendent
 Confession (1955) - Superintendent Beckman
 Portrait of Alison (1955) - (uncredited)
 Handcuffs, London (1955) - Det. Sgt Wyatt
 Private's Progress (1956) - General Tomlinson
 23 Paces to Baker Street (1956) - Police Inspector (uncredited)
 Morning Call (1957) - Plainclothesman
 Brothers in Law (1957) - Cleaver
 There's Always a Thursday (1957) - Crosby
 The Crooked Sky (1957) - Senior Civil Servant
 Five Clues to Fortune (1957) - Mr Robson
 The Big Chance (1957) - Police Inspector
 The One That Got Away (1957) - Bystander (uncredited)
 Man from Tangier (1957) - Inspector Meredith
 Zoo Baby (1957) - Plumber
 Count Five and Die (1957) - Lt Miller
 Undercover Girl (1958) - Det. Insp. Willingdon 
 Violent Playground (1958) - (uncredited)
 Gideon's Day (1958) - Henry Dawson (uncredited)
 A Night to Remember (1958) - Chief Engineer Johnston, SS Carpathia (uncredited)
 Corridors of Blood (1958) - Wilkes
 Hidden Homicide (1959) - Ashbury
 The Great Van Robbery (1959) - Surgeon
 The Child and the Killer (1959) - Inspector
 Innocent Meeting (1959) - Martin
 Web of Suspicion (1959) - Inspector Clark
 No Safety Ahead (1959) - Langton
 High Jump (1959) - Inspector
 The Heart of a Man (1959) - Policeman (uncredited)
 A Woman's Temptation (1959) - Police Constable
 Follow a Star (1959) - Policeman (uncredited)
 Dead Lucky (1960) - Assistant Commissioner (uncredited)
 Beat Girl (1960) - FO Official
 A Taste of Honey (1961) - Simpson
 Information Received (1961) - Supt Jeffcote
 Two and Two Make Six (1962) - Policeman (uncredited)
 The Traitors (1962)
 Jigsaw (1962) - Chief Constable (uncredited)
 Live Now, Pay Later (1962) 
 The Comedy Man (1964) - (uncredited)
 Where the Spies Are (1966) - Sir Robert
 Prehistoric Women (1967) - Colonel Hammond
 Subterfuge (1968) - Fennimore
 The Haunted House of Horror (1969) - John Bradley
 The Magic Christian (1969) - Maltravers
 Loot (1970) - Doctor 
 Toomorrow (1970) - Principal (uncredited)
 The Rise and Rise of Michael Rimmer (1970) - General Strike
 Dad's Army (1971) - Inspector Hardcastle
 To Catch a Spy (1971) - Ambassador
 Tomorrow (1972) - (uncredited)
 A Nightingale Sang in Berkeley Square (1979) - Judge
 The Mirror Crack'd (1980) - Villager (uncredited)

Television appearances

 Educated Evans (1957, 1 episode) as Sergeant
 Charlesworth (1959, 1 episode) as Inspector Godfrey
 Francis Storm Investigates (1960, 1 episode) as  Chief Inspector Bloom
 The Sullavan Brothers (1965,  1 episode) as Jim Fenn
 Dad's Army (1970-1977, 38 episodes) as The Colonel / Captain Pritchard / HG Sergeant
 Steptoe and Son (1970, 1 episode) as Mr Caldwell
 The Liver Birds (1971, 1 episode) as Manager
 Bless This House  (1972-1974, 1 episode) as George Humphries / Sir Maxwell
 Are You Being Served? (1973-1974, 2 episodes) as The 40" Waist / Dr Wainwright  
 My Name Is Harry Worth (1974, 1 episode) as Magistrate
 Love Thy Neighbour (1975, 1 episode) as Doctor
 You're Only Young Twice (1977) as Mr Whittaker
 Going Straight (1978, 1 episode) as Inspector
 George and Mildred (1978-1979, 3 episodes) as Mr Bowles / Brown / Reginald Clifton-White
 Robin's Nest (1979) as Carter
 Nancy Astor (1982, 2 episodes) as MP

References

External links
 

English male film actors
English male television actors
1909 births
1985 deaths
People from Reigate
20th-century English male actors